Mark Bradley (born 10 August 1976) is a Scottish football player and manager. Bradley played for Hearts, Stirling Albion, Cowdenbeath, Berwick Rangers, Dumbarton, Bathgate Thistle and Linlithgow Rose. He was appointed manager of Linlithgow Rose in December 2011.

On 27 November 2016, Bradley became the new manager of Kilbirnie Ladeside
he brings Paul Ronald with him to Valefield as his assistant.

On 22 May 2017, Bradley returned to his managerial position at Linlithgow Rose.

References

1976 births
Living people
Footballers from Glasgow
Association football midfielders
Scottish footballers
Heart of Midlothian F.C. players
Stirling Albion F.C. players
Cowdenbeath F.C. players
Berwick Rangers F.C. players
Dumbarton F.C. players
Bathgate Thistle F.C. players
Scottish football managers
Scottish Football League players
Scottish Junior Football Association players
Linlithgow Rose F.C. players